Tân Phú is the main town in Tân Phú District, Đồng Nai Province, in southern Vietnam (the region is also called Đông Nam Bộ). 

Tân Phú is located on route 20 (quốc lộ 20), the road connecting route 1 at Dầu Giây with Đà Lạt in the province of Lâm Đồng.

References
  

District capitals in Vietnam
Townships in Vietnam
Populated places in Đồng Nai province